An index of articles related to the former nation known as the Soviet Union. It covers the Soviet revolutionary period until the dissolution of the Soviet Union. This list includes topics, events, persons and other items of national significance within the Soviet Union. It does not include places within the Soviet Union, unless the place is associated with an event of national significance (e.g., Moscow). This index also does not contain items related to Soviet Military History.

0–9

 1924 Soviet Constitution
 1936 Soviet Constitution
 1940–1944 insurgency in Chechnya
 1951 anti-Chechen pogrom in Eastern Kazakhstan
 1958 Grozny riots
 1965 Soviet economic reform
 1970s Soviet Union aliyah
 1973 Soviet economic reform
 1977 Soviet Constitution
 1978 Russian Constitution
 1979 Soviet economic reform
 1980 Summer Olympics
 1991 Soviet coup d'état attempt
 1991 Soviet referendum

 Return to Table of Contents

A 

 Abkhaz Autonomous Soviet Socialist Republic
 Academy of Sciences of the Soviet Union
 Adjar Autonomous Soviet Socialist Republic
 Administrator of Affairs of the Soviet Union
 Agriculture in the Soviet Union
 Akademikerförbundet SSR
 Akhmatova, Anna
 All-Russian Central Executive Committee
 All-Russian Congress of Soviets
 All-Russian Scientific Research And Design Institute of Energy Technology
 American Committee for the Defense of Leon Trotsky
 Andreyev, Andrey Andreyevich
 Andropov, Yuri – Soviet leader from 1982 to 1984
 Anti-Party Group
 Anti-revisionism
 Anti-Stalinist left
 Apollo–Soyuz
 Armenian Soviet Socialist Republic
 Association of Artists of Revolutionary Russia
 Astron (spacecraft)
 Attempted assassination of Leonid Brezhnev
 Autonomous Soviet Socialist Republics of the Soviet Union
 Azerbaijan Soviet Socialist Republic

 Return to Table of Contents

B 

 Bashkir Autonomous Soviet Socialist Republic
 Belavezha Accords
 Beria, Lavrentiy – Soviet politician and Secret Police Official 
 Bibliography of Stalinism and the Soviet Union
 Bibliography of the Post Stalinist Soviet Union
 Bibliography of the Russian Revolution and Civil War
 Bogdanov, Alexander
 Bolsheviks
 Bourgeoisie
 Brezhnev, Leonid – Soviet leader from 1964 to 1982
 Legacy of Leonid Brezhnev
 Brezhnev Doctrine
 Brezhnev's trilogy
 Broadcasting in the Soviet Union
 Bukharin, Nikolai
 Bulganin, Nikolai
 Buryat Autonomous Soviet Socialist Republic

 Return to Table of Contents

C 

 Case of the Anti-Soviet "Bloc of Rightists and Trotskyites"
 Case of Trotskyist Anti-Soviet Military Organization
 Censorship in the Soviet Union
 Central Committee of the Communist Party of the Soviet Union
 Central Executive Committee of the Soviet Union
 Checheno-Ingush Autonomous Soviet Socialist Republic
 Chernobyl disaster
 Cheka – a short commonly used abbreviation for the "All-Russian Extraordinary Commission for Combating Counter-Revolution and Sabotage."
 Chelomey, Vladimir
 Chernenko, Konstantin – Soviet leader from 1984 to 1985
 Chervyakov, Alexander
 Chronology of Soviet secret police agencies
 Cold War
 Collective farming
 Kolkhoz
 Collective leadership in the Soviet Union
 Collectivization in the Soviet Union
 Commemorative coins of the Soviet Union
 Communism
 Communism in 20 years
 Communist party
 Communist Party of the Soviet Union
 Communist Party of Armenia
 Communist Party of Azerbaijan
 Communist Party of Byelorussia
 Communist Party of Estonia
 Communist Party of Georgia
 Communist Party of Kazakhstan
 Communist Party of Kirghizia
 Communist Party of Latvia
 Communist Party of Lithuania
 Communist Party of Moldova
 Communist Party of Tajikistan
 Communist Party of Turkmenistan
 Communist Party of Ukraine
 Communist Party of Uzbekistan
 Congress of People's Deputies of the Soviet Union
 Congress of Soviets of the Soviet Union
 Congress of the Communist Party of the Soviet Union
 12th Congress of the Russian Communist Party (Bolsheviks) (1923)
 13th Congress of the Russian Communist Party (Bolsheviks) (1924)
 14th Congress of the All-Union Communist Party (Bolsheviks) (1925)
 15th Congress of the All-Union Communist Party (Bolsheviks) (1927)
 16th Congress of the All-Union Communist Party (Bolsheviks) (1930)
 17th Congress of the All-Union Communist Party (Bolsheviks) (1934)
 18th Congress of the All-Union Communist Party (Bolsheviks) (1939)
 19th Congress of the Communist Party of the Soviet Union (1952)
 20th Congress of the Communist Party of the Soviet Union (1956)
 21st Congress of the Communist Party of the Soviet Union (1959)
 22nd Congress of the Communist Party of the Soviet Union (1961)
 23rd Congress of the Communist Party of the Soviet Union (1966)
 24th Congress of the Communist Party of the Soviet Union (1971)
 25th Congress of the Communist Party of the Soviet Union (1976)
 26th Congress of the Communist Party of the Soviet Union (1981)
 27th Congress of the Communist Party of the Soviet Union (1986)
 28th Congress of the Communist Party of the Soviet Union (1990)
 Constitution of the Soviet Union
 1924 Soviet Constitution
 1936 Soviet Constitution
 1977 Soviet Constitution
 Congress of Soviets
 Consumer goods in the Soviet Union
 Council of Defense of the USSR
 Congress of People's Deputies of the Soviet Union
 Council of Ministers of the Soviet Union
 Council of People's Commissars
 Criticism of communism
 Cuba–Soviet Union relations
 Culture of the Soviet Union

 Return to Table of Contents

D 

 Dagestan Autonomous Soviet Socialist Republic
 Dates of establishment of diplomatic relations with the Soviet Union
 Decree about Arrests, Prosecutor Supervision and Course of Investigation
 De-Stalinization
 Death and state funeral of Joseph Stalin
 Death and state funeral of Leonid Brezhnev
 Death and state funeral of Vladimir Lenin
 Death dates of victims of the Great Purge
 Declaration of the Creation of the USSR
 Declaration of the Rights of the Peoples of Russia
 Defense Council (Soviet Union)
 Dekulakization
 Demographics of the Soviet Union
 Demokratizatsiya (Soviet Union)
 Deportation of the Chechens and Ingush
 Deportation of Chinese in the Soviet Union
 Deportation of the Crimean Tatars
 Deportation of the Kalmyks
 Deportation of Koreans in the Soviet Union
 Deportation of the Meskhetian Turks
 Deputies of the Soviet Union
 Détente
 Dewey Commission
 Dissolution of the Soviet Union
 Doctors' plot
 Dual power
 Dzerzhinsky, Felix

 Return to Table of Contents

E 

 Eastern Bloc
 Economy of the Soviet Union
 Education in the Soviet Union
 Likbez
 Energy policy of the Soviet Union
 Era of Stagnation
 Evil Empire speech
 Excess mortality in the Soviet Union under Joseph Stalin
 Explosion of the Steamship "Dalstroy"

 Return to Table of Contents

F

 Family in the Soviet Union
 Famines in Russia and USSR
 Famine of 1921–22
 Famine of 1921–22 in Tatarstan
 Famine of 1932–33
 Famine of 1946–47
 Holodomor – Famine of 1932–33 in Ukraine
 Kazakh famine of 1932–33
 Fashion in the Soviet Union
 First Deputies of the Soviet Union
 First Russian Society of Communist Agricultural Workers
 First Ladies of the Soviet Union
 Five-year plans for the national economy of the Soviet Union
 First five-year plan
 Eighth five-year plan (Soviet Union)
 Ninth five-year plan (Soviet Union)
 Tenth five-year plan (Soviet Union)
 Eleventh five-year plan (Soviet Union)
 Flag of the Soviet Union
 Flag of the Armenian SSR
 Flag of Azerbaijan SSR
 Flag of Byelorussian SSR
 Flag of the Estonian SSR
 Flag of the Georgian SSR
 Flag of the Karelo-Finnish SSR
 Flag of the Kazakh SSR
 Flag of the Kirghiz SSR
 Flag of the Latvian SSR
 Flag of the Lithuanian SSR
 Flag of the Moldavian SSR
 Flag of the Russian SFSR
 Flag of the Tajik SSR
 Flag of the Transcaucasion SFSR
 Flag of the Turkmen SSR
 Flag of the Ukrainian SSR
 Flag of the Uzbek SSR
 Forced settlements in the Soviet Union
 Foreign Literature Committee
 Foreign relations of the Soviet Union
 Foreign trade of the Soviet Union
 Frunze, Mikhail

 Return to Table of Contents

G 

 Gagarin, Yuri
 General Directorate for the Protection of State Secrets in the Press
 General Secretary of the Communist Party of the Soviet Union
 Geography of the Soviet Union
 Glasnost
 Glossary of Russian and USSR aviation acronyms
 Glassboro Summit Conference
 Glavpolitprosvet – also known as Main Political and Educational Committee of the People's Commissariat of Education of the Russian Socialist Federative Soviet Republic
 Glushko, Valentin
 Gorbachev, Mikhail
 Gorky, Maxim
 Gosplan
 Government of the Soviet Union
 Ministry for State Security
 Ministry of Education
 Ministry of Foreign Affairs
 Ministry of Finance
 Ministry of Finance of the RSFSR
 Ministry of Health
 Ministry of Justice
 And others...
 Great Purge
 Grechko, Andrei
 Gulag
 Gumilyov, Lev

 Return to Table of Contents

H 

 Helsinki Accords
 Hero of Socialist Labour
 Historiography in the Soviet Union
 History of the Soviet Union
 1917–1927, from the October Revolution to Stalin's consolidation of power
 1927–1953, the Stalin era
 1953–1964, post-Stalinist power struggle and the Khrushchev Era
 1964–1982, the Brezhnev Era
 1982–1991, failed attempts to preserve the Soviet Union, ended by its dissolution
 History of Russian animation
 History of the Jews in the Soviet Union
 Holodomor
 Human rights in the Soviet Union
 Hungarian Revolution of 1956

 Return to Table of Contents

I 

 Ideology of the Communist Party of the Soviet Union
 Ideological repression in the Soviet Union
 Industrialization in the Soviet Union
 Intelligentsia
 International Department of the Communist Party of the Soviet Union
 Iraq–Russia relations
 Islam in the Soviet Union
 Soviet Orientalist studies in Islam

 Return to Table of Contents]

J 

 Joint State Political Directorate – commonly known as the OGPU, the secret police of the Soviet Union from 1923 to 1934.

 Return to Table of Contents

K 

 Kabardino-Balkarian Autonomous Soviet Socialist Republic
 Kaganovich, Lazar
 Kalinin, Mikhail
 Karelian Autonomous Soviet Socialist Republic
 Kazakh famine of 1932–33
 Kazakh Autonomous Socialist Soviet Republic
 KGB
 Khaibakh massacre
 Khrushchev, Nikita – Soviet leader from 1953 to 1964 and Ukrainian SSR leader from 1938 to 1949
 Khrushchev Thaw 
 Kirichenko, Alexei
 Kirilenko, Andrei
 Kirov, Sergei
 Kolkhoz
 Komi Autonomous Soviet Socialist Republic
 Komsomol
 Korean Air Lines Flight 007
 Korenizatsiya
 Kosygin, Alexei – The longest serving Chairman of the Council of Ministers (e.g. Premier)
 Kosygin reform – A renowned Soviet economic reform
 Kremlin
 Kremlin Wall
 Kremlin Wall Necropolis
 Krestinsky, Nikolay
 Krupskaya, Nadezhda
 Kulak
 Kuznetsov, Vasili

 Return to Table of Contents

L 

 Labor army
 Languages of the Soviet Union
 Law of the Soviet Union
 League of Militant Atheists
 Lenin, Vladimir – First Soviet leader from 1922 to 1924
 Lenin's Mausoleum
 Lenin Prize
 Lenin's Testament
 Lenina Bayrah
 Leninism
 Likbez
 Literaturnaya Gazeta
 Litkens, Evgraf
 Lukyanov, Anatoly
 Lunacharsky, Anatoly
 Lysenko, Trofim

 Return to Table of Contents

Lists 

 Bibliography of Stalinism and the Soviet Union
 Bibliography of the Russian Revolution and Civil War
 List of chairmen of the KGB
 List of Chairmen of the Soviet of Nationalities
 List of Chairmen of the Soviet of the Union
 List of Deputy Premiers of the Soviet Union
 List of flag bearers for the Soviet Union at the Olympics
 List of governments of the Soviet Union
 List of heads of state of the Soviet Union
 List of Gulag camps
 List of leaders of the Soviet Union
 List of Soviet Antarctic expeditions
 List of Soviet films of the year by ticket sales
 List of Soviet Union–United States summits

 Return to Table of Contents

M 

 Main Directorate of State Security – commonly known as GUGB, the central security body for the NKVD.
 Maisky, Ivan
 Malenkov, Georgy – Soviet leader
 Mandelstam, Osip
 Mari Autonomous Soviet Socialist Republic
 Marxism
 Marxism–Leninism
 Mass graves in the Soviet Union
 Mass operations of the NKVD
 Mayakovsky, Vladimir
 Mensheviks
 Mikoyan, Anastas
 Military Collegium of the Supreme Court of the Soviet Union
 Military-Industrial Commission of the USSR
 Ministries of the Soviet Union
 Ministry of Internal Affairs – commonly known as the MVD, a Soviet Secret Police agency.
 Mitrokhin Archive
 Molotov, Vyacheslav
 Molotov–Ribbentrop Pact
 Mordovian Autonomous Soviet Socialist Republic
 Moscow
 Moscow Trials

 Return to Table of Contents

N 

 Nafta (oil company)
 Nakhichevan Autonomous Soviet Socialist Republic
 National delimitation in the Soviet Union
 Nedelin catastrophe
 New Economic Policy
 New Soviet man
 Night of the Murdered Poets
 NKVD
 Greek Operation of the NKVD
 Latvian Operation of the NKVD
 Mass operations of the NKVD
 NKVD Order No. 00439
 NKVD Order No. 00447
 NKVD Order No. 00485
 NKVD Order No. 00593
 NKVD Order No. 00689
 NKVD prisoner massacres
 NKVD troika
 Polish Operation of the NKVD
 NKVD Order No. 00486
 Special Council of the NKVD 
 North Ossetian Autonomous Soviet Socialist Republic
 Novodevichy Cemetery

 Return to Table of Contents

O 

 On the Cult of Personality and Its Consequences
 Operation Trust
 Order of Lenin
 Orders, decorations, and medals of the Soviet Union

 Return to Table of Contents

P 

 People's Commissariat for State Security – commonly known as the NKGB
 People's Commissariat for Agriculture
 People's Commissariat for Education
 People's Court (Soviet Union)
 People's correspondent
 Peredvizhniki
 Perestroika
 Pervukhin, Mikhail
 Petrovsky, Grigory
 Petrushevsky, Dmitry
 Podgorny, Nikolai
 Pokrovsky, Mikhail
 Politburo of the Communist Party of the Soviet Union
 Political repression in the Soviet Union
 Politics of the Soviet Union
 Population transfer in the Soviet Union
 Pravda
 Premier of the Soviet Union
 President of the Soviet Union
 Presidium of the Supreme Soviet
 Primakov, Yevgeny
 Printed media in the Soviet Union
 Procurator General of the Soviet Union
 Proletariat
 Propiska in the Soviet Union
 Public holidays in the Soviet Union
 Punin, Nikolay
 Purges of the Communist Party of the Soviet Union
 Pyatakov, Georgy

 Return to Table of Contents

R 

 Rabinovich, Grigory
 Racism in the Soviet Union
 Radio in the Soviet Union
 Rail transport in the Soviet Union
 Ready for Labour and Defence of the USSR
 Red Army
 Red Square
 Refusenik
 Religion in the Soviet Union
 Renovationism – also known as the Living Church and later the Orthodox Church in USSR.
 Republics of the Soviet Union
 Armenian SSR
 Azerbaijan SSR
 Byelorussian SSR 
 Estonian SSR
 Georgian SSR
 Kazakh SSR
 Kirghiz SSR
 Latvian SSR
 Lithuanian SSR
 Moldavian SSR
 Russian SFSR
 Tajik SSR
 Turkmen SSR
 Uzbek SSR
 Ukrainian SSR 
 Right Opposition
 Rise of Joseph Stalin
 Roerich, Nicholas
 Russian avant-garde
 Russian famine of 1921–22
 Russian Soviet Federative Socialist Republic
 Rykov, Alexey – Soviet premier from 1924 to 1930
 Ryutin affair
 Ryutin, Martemyan
 Ryzhkov, Nikolai – Soviet premier from 1985 to 1991

 Return to Table of Contents

S 

 Saburov, Maksim
 Science and technology in the Soviet Union
 Scissors Crisis
 Second economy of the Soviet Union
 Shami-Damulla
 Shepilov, Dmitri
 Sholokhov, Mikhail
 Shvernik, Nikolai
 Sino-Soviet split
 Socialism
 Socialist realism
 Sokol space suit
 Sovetsky Sport
 Soviet (council)
 Soviet calendar
 Soviet crewed lunar programs
 Soviet cuisine
 Soviet democracy
 Soviet Empire
 Soviet of Nationalities
 Soviet of the Union
 Soviet Orientalist studies in Islam
 Soviet people
 Soviet republic (system of government)
 Soviet Revolutionary Communists (Bolsheviks)
 Soviet space program
 Soviet Union
 Soviet Union and the United Nations
 Soviet Union at the Olympics
 Soviet Union national ice hockey team
 Soviet Union national rugby union team
 Soviet Union women's national rugby union team
 Sovietization
 Sovnarkhoz – Regional Economic Soviet
 Soyuz (spacecraft)
 Space Race
 Special Council of the NKVD
 Spiritual Administration of the Muslims of Central Asia and Kazakhstan
 Sputnik 1
 Sputnik 2
 Stakhanov, Alexey
 Stakhanovite movement
 Stalin's cult of personality
 Stalin, Joseph – Soviet leader from 1924 to 1953
 Stalin's cult of personality
 Stalingrad – now known as Volgograd (1961–present), formerly known as Tsaritsyn (1589–1925)
 Stalinism
 Stalin Epigram
 Stalinist architecture
 Stasova, Elena
 State capitalism
 State Committee of the Soviet Union
 State Emblem of the Soviet Union
 State Planning Committee – also known as Gosplan.
 State Political Directorate – commonly known as the GPU, an intelligence service and secret police agency, operating from 1922 to 1923.
 State quality mark of the USSR
 Suppressed research in the Soviet Union
 Supreme Court of the Soviet Union
 Supreme Soviet of the Soviet Union
 Suslov, Mikhail
 Sverdlov, Yakov

 Return to Table of Contents

T 

 Tatar Autonomous Soviet Socialist Republic
 Television in the Soviet Union
 Tereshkova, Valentina
 Tikhonov, Nikolai – Soviet Chairman of the Council of Ministers 1980–1985 and First Deputy from 1976 to 1980
 Tuvan Autonomous Soviet Socialist Republic
 Transport in the Soviet Union
 Treaty of Moscow (1970)
 Treaty on the Creation of the USSR
 Trial of the Sixteen – Soviet show trial of Polish Underground Leaders (1945)
 Trotsky, Leon
 Trotskyism
 Tsaritsyn – now known as Volgograd (1961–present), formerly known as Stalingrad (1925–1961)
 Tskhakaya, Mikhail

 Return to Table of Contents

U 

 Udmurt Autonomous Soviet Socialist Republic
 United Opposition (Soviet Union)
 Unified Sports Classification System of the USSR and Russia
 Union of Soviet Writers
 Union of Sovereign States
 Ustinov, Dmitry

 Return to Table of Contents

V 

 Vega program
 Venera
 Vladimir Lenin All-Union Pioneer Organization
 Volgograd formerly known as Tsaritsyn (1589–1925) and Stalingrad (1925–1961)
 Voluntary Sports Societies of the Soviet Union
 Voroshilov, Kliment
 Voskhod (spacecraft)
 Vostok programme
 Vostok 1
 Vostok 2
 Vostok 3
 Vostok 4
 Vostok 5
 Vostok 6
 Vostok (spacecraft)

 Return to Table of Contents

W 

 War communism
 Water supply and sanitation in Russia

 Return to Table of Contents

Y 

 Yagoda, Genrikh
 Yakut Autonomous Soviet Socialist Republic
 Yanayev, Gennady
 Yangel, Mikhail
 Yasnov, Mikhail
 Yeltsin, Boris
 Yezhov, Nikolai 
 Young Guard (Soviet resistance)

 Return to Table of Contents

Z 

 Zarya (spacecraft)
 Zhdanov, Andrei
 Zinoviev, Grigory

 Return to Table of Contents

See also 
 Index of articles related to the Russian Revolution and Civil War
 Bibliography of the Russian Revolution and Civil War
 Bibliography of Stalinism and the Soviet Union
 Bibliography of the Post Stalinist Soviet Union
 Lists of country-related topics
 List of Russian people

 Return to Table of Contents

Notes

References

 
Index
Soviet Union